Paul Capdeville was the defending champion, but lost in the second round to Marco Trungelliti.
Facundo Bagnis won the title by defeating Thiemo de Bakker 7–6(7–2), 7–6(7–3) in the final.

Seeds

Draw

Finals

Top half

Bottom half

References
 Main Draw
 Qualifying Draw

Cachantun Cup - Singles
2013 - Singles